"Beware" is a song attributed to Morry Lasco, Dick Adams, and Fleecie Moore. It was performed by Louis Jordan and his Tympany Five, recorded in January 1946, and released on the Decca label (catalog no. 18818-A). 

It peaked at No. 2 on Billboards race record chart and remained on the chart for nine weeks. It also reached No. 20 on the pop chart.  It was ranked No. 13 on the magazine's list of the most played race records of 1946.  

Jordan and the Tympany Five also performed the song as the title track for the motion picture Beware (1946).

Jordan biographer Stephen Koch noted that the granting of partial songwriting credit to Jordan's wife, Fleecie Moore, was part of "a publishing and tax dodge gone awry."

See also
 Billboard Most-Played Race Records of 1946

References

1946 songs
Louis Jordan songs